Reynold's Tavern is an 18th-century tavern located at 6 Church Circle in Annapolis, Maryland.  It is the oldest tavern in Annapolis, and one of the oldest in the United States. The building has been nominated to be included on the National Register of Historic Places.

References

Buildings and structures in Maryland